The women's 5000 metres event at the 1997 Summer Universiade was held at the Stadio Cibali in Catania, Italy on 26 August.

Results

References

Athletics at the 1997 Summer Universiade
1997 in women's athletics
1997